Nomia nortoni is a species of sweat bee in the family Halictidae. It is found in Central America and North America.

Subspecies
Two subspecies belong to the species Nomia nortoni:
 Nomia nortoni cressoni Westwood, 1875
 Nomia nortoni nortoni Cresson, 1868

References

External links

 

nortoni
Articles created by Qbugbot
Insects described in 1868